Cha Keon-Myung (born December 26, 1981) is a South Korean football player who plays for Jeju United FC. He has also played for Suwon Samsung Bluewings and Gwangju Sangmu.

Career statistics 
As of end of 2008 season

References

K-League player record 
Korean FA Cup match result 

1981 births
Living people
Association football defenders
South Korean footballers
Suwon Samsung Bluewings players
Gimcheon Sangmu FC players
Jeju United FC players
K League 1 players